The Columbus Historic Riverfront Industrial District encompasses one of the most significant assemblages of 19th-century waterpowered mill technology in the American South.  A National Historic Landmark District, it includes five historic industrial complexes with elements surviving as far back as the 1830s, located in four separate areas along the eastern bank of the Chattahoochee River in Columbus, Georgia.  It was declared a National Historic Landmark in 1978.

History
This location was recognized early in the American Industrial Revolution as a prime location for waterpowered factories, and the river was first dammed in 1828 (by a predecessor to the now-breached City Mills Dam), beginning what became one of the South's largest 19th-century industrial complexes. Embedded in five major industrial sites are the remains of industrial components used in the transfer of water power, and for the early generation and transfer of electrical power. Included in these are the Eagle and Phenix Mills, once the South's largest textile operation. Columbus was a powerhouse of manufacturing for the Confederacy during the American Civil War.

Bibb Mill
The main building of the Bibb Mill complex is a long five-story brick building, set on a bluff overlooking the river.  Although it is an early 20th-century building, one of the smaller buildings in the complex includes remnants of a pulley and rope drive system.  This system was used until 1954, when its main drive shaft broke.

City Mills
The City Mills complex was built as a grist mill.  The oldest building dates to 1869, and was built by Horace King, a well-known regional African-American contractor.  The original 1828 dam was replaced in 1908, and the main building was adapted for electrical power generation and distribution.  It houses power generators installed in 1919, some of which operated into the 1960s.

Muscogee Mills
The Muscogee Mills include the broadest diversity of architecture of the surviving complexes, including both ornate 19th-century industrial architecture, and utilitarian 20th-century buildings, as well as the city's original Carnegie library.  Traces of the original 1844 millrace are also still evident.

Eagle and Phenix Mills
The Eagle and Phenix Mills complex consists of three main mills, oriented perpendicular to the river, all which have origins in 19th-century construction, but have generally been altered or extended.  This mill's original raceway and dam (now breached) also survive to some degree.

Columbus Ironworks

This complex's oldest buildings date to the early 20th century, its older buildings destroyed by fire in 1902.  The complex includes several generations of early electrical equipment, including a DC generator and three AC generators.  A portion of the property has been converted into a convention and event center.

See also
List of National Historic Landmarks in Georgia (U.S. state)
National Register of Historic Places listings in Muscogee County, Georgia

Endnotes

External links
 Historic Columbus web site

National Historic Landmarks in Georgia (U.S. state)
Historic districts on the National Register of Historic Places in Georgia (U.S. state)
Historic districts in Columbus, Georgia
National Register of Historic Places in Muscogee County, Georgia